Corpora paraaortica can refer to:
 Aortic body (glomus aorticum)
 Organ of Zuckerkandl